Cambarus is a large and diverse genus of crayfish from the United States and Canada.

Description 
The genus Cambarus is the second largest freshwater crayfish genus inhabiting the Northern Hemisphere, with only sixty fewer species than the genus Procambarus. Though Cambarus are varied across species, the two terminal elements that make up the male form I gonopod form ninety degree angles with the central appendage, allowing for their identification. Unlike the genus Procambarus whose first pleopod tends to have three processes at the tip, Cambarus has only one or two.

As a genus containing nearly 100 species, Cambarus's coloration is variable. Cambarus bartonii is dark brown, while species like Cambarus pauleyi range from subtle to vibrant blues and reds. Other species are light green or grayish in color.

Biogeography 
Most species of Cambarus are restricted to the United States and Canada. They are distributed along the eastern coast, extending from New Brunswick to northern Florida. However, the genus extends as far westward as the Rocky Mountains of Wyoming and Colorado, inhabiting a variety of freshwater environments.

Habitat 
Cambarus occupy a range of freshwater environments including streams, rivers, lakes, and burrows. Burrowing species of the genus include Cambarus dubius. Cambarus also include many cave-dwelling species, both stygobites and stygophiles. While salinity and temperature changes minimally affect Cambarus, the genus has shown an intolerance to pollution.

Ecology

Diet 
Like other crayfish, Cambarus are foragers. Diets are largely plant-based, though Cambarus also consume small marine organisms like molluscs, larvae, tadpoles and amphibian eggs. Cambarus consume small rodents or birds when available. In their first year, Cambarus typically consume 1-4% of their overall body-weight each day. The genus is central to many freshwater food webs as they help maintain water quality through consumption of algae.

Vulnerability 
One of the largest crayfish genera, Cambarus includes a sizable number of vulnerable species. Cave-dwellers like Cambarus jonesi are at risk due to their lack of genetic diversity and low population count. Other species like Cambarus veteranus are at risk due to human practices like logging and mining, which increase sediment amounts in freshwater environments. Increased sediment causes these freshwater environments to be uninhabitable, and Cambarus are forced to relocate as a result.

Growth 
Molting occurs among Cambarus approximately 5-10 times during their first year, and 3-5 times during subsequent years. Cambarus remain relatively inactive during periods of molting, as the shedding of chitinous exoskeletons leaves them more vulnerable to predation and injury. Many species of Cambarus continue to grow well into adulthood.

Reproduction 
Cambarus typically mate in the early spring. Both Cambarus bartonii and Cambarus robustus only mate once during their three-year life span, with females of both carrying fewer eggs than those of the genus Orconectes.

Gallery

Classification
The genus Cambarus contains around 100 species, many of which are listed on the IUCN Red List. Species in the genus were formerly divided among 12 subgenera. In a 2017 study, these subgenera were found to lack any phylogenetic validity and were therefore eliminated.

Cambarus aculabrum Hobbs & Brown, 1987  – Benton County cave crayfish
Cambarus acuminatus Faxon, 1884  - Acuminate Crayfish
Cambarus adustus Thoma, Fetzner, Stocker and Loughman, 2016   - Dusky Mudbug
Cambarus aldermanorum J. E. Cooper and Price, 2010 
Cambarus andersoni Jones and Eversole, 2015 
Cambarus angularis Hobbs & R. W. Bouchard, 1994 
Cambarus appalachiensis Loughman, Welsh and Thoma, 2017 
Cambarus asperimanus Faxon, 1914 
Cambarus bartonii (Fabricius, 1798)  – Appalachian Brook Crayfish
Cambarus batchi Schuster, 1973  – bluegrass crayfish
Cambarus bouchardi Hobbs, 1970  – Big South Fork crayfish
Cambarus brachydactylus Hobbs, 1953 
Cambarus brimleyorum Cooper, 2006 
Cambarus buntingi R. W. Bouchard, 1973  – Bunting crayfish
Cambarus callainus Thoma, Loughman & Fetzner, 2014  - Big Sandy crayfish
Cambarus carinirostris  Hay, 1914  – Rock Crayfish
Cambarus carolinus (Erichson, 1846) 
Cambarus catagius Hobbs & Perkins, 1967  – Greensboro Burrowing Crayfish
Cambarus causeyi Reimer, 1966 
Cambarus chasmodactylus James, 1966  – New River crayfish
Cambarus chaugaensis Prins & Hobbs, 1972  – Chauga crayfish
Cambarus clairitae Schuster and Taylor, 2016  
Cambarus clivosus Taylor, Soucek & Organ, 2006 
Cambarus conasaugaensis Hobbs & Hobbs III, 1962 
Cambarus coosae Hobbs, 1981 
Cambarus coosawattae Hobbs, 1981  – Coosawattae crayfish
Cambarus cracens R. W. Bouchard & Hobbs, 1976 
Cambarus crinipes R. W. Bouchard, 1973 
Cambarus cryptodytes Hobbs, 1941  – Dougherty Plain cave crayfish
Cambarus cumberlandensis Hobbs & R. W. Bouchard, 1973  – Cumberland crayfish
Cambarus cymatilis Hobbs, 1970  – Conasauga blue burrower
Cambarus davidi J. E. Cooper, 2000  – Carolina Ladle Crayfish
Cambarus deweesae R. W. Bouchard & Etnier, 1979  – valley flame crayfish
Cambarus distans Rhoades, 1944  – boxclaw crawfish
Cambarus diupalma Jones and Eversole, 2015 
Cambarus doughertyensis Cooper & Skelton, 2003  - Dougherty burrowing crayfish
Cambarus dubius Faxon, 1884  – upland burrowing crayfish
Cambarus ectopistes Loughman & Williams, 2021 
Cambarus eeseeohensis Thoma, 2005 
Cambarus elkensis Jezerinac & Stocker, 1993  – Elk River crayfish
Cambarus englishi Hobbs & Hall, 1972 
Cambarus extraneus Hagen, 1870  – Chickamauga crayfish
Cambarus fasciatus Hobbs, 1981  – Etowah crayfish
Cambarus friaufi Hobbs, 1953  – hairy crayfish
Cambarus gentryi Hobbs, 1970 
Cambarus georgiae Hobbs, 1981  – Little Tennessee crayfish
Cambarus girardianus Faxon, 1884 
Cambarus graysoni Faxon, 1914  – Two-spot crayfish
Cambarus guenteri Loughman, Henkanaththegedara, Fetzner and Thoma, 2017 
Cambarus halli Hobbs, 1968 
Cambarus hamulatus (Cope, 1881)  – Prickly cave crayfish
Cambarus harti Hobbs, 1981  – Piedmont blue burrower
Cambarus hatfeildi Z. J. Loughman, 2013 
Cambarus hazardi Loughman, Henkanaththegedara, Fetzner and Thoma, 2017 
Cambarus hiwasseensis Hobbs, 1981  – Hiwassee crayfish
Cambarus hobbsorum J. E. Cooper, 2001  – Rocky River crayfish
Cambarus howardi Hobbs & Hall, 1969  – Chattahoochee crayfish
Cambarus hubbsi Creaser, 1931 
Cambarus hubrichti Hobbs, 1952  – Salem cave crayfish
Cambarus hystricosus Cooper & Cooper, 2003 
Cambarus jezerinaci Thoma, 2000 
Cambarus johni Cooper, 2006 
Cambarus jonesi Hobbs & Barr, 1960  – Alabama cave crayfish
Cambarus laconensis Buhay & Crandall, 2009   - Lacon Exit cave crayfish
Cambarus latimanus (Le Conte, 1856) 
Cambarus lenati J. E. Cooper, 2000  – Broad River crayfish
Cambarus lentiginosus  Jones and Eversole, 2016 
Cambarus longirostris Faxon, 1885 
Cambarus longulus Girard, 1852 
Cambarus loughmani Foltz II et al., 2018 - Blue Teays mudbug
Cambarus maculatus Hobbs & Pflieger, 1988  – freckled crayfish
Cambarus magerae Thoma and Fetzner, 2015 
Cambarus manningi Hobbs, 1981 
Cambarus monongalensis Ortmann, 1905  - Monongahela or blue crayfish
Cambarus nerterius Hobbs, 1964  – Greenbrier cave crayfish
Cambarus nodosus R. W. Bouchard & Hobbs, 1976 
Cambarus obeyensis Hobbs & Shoup, 1947  – Obey crayfish
Cambarus obstipus Hall, 1959 
Cambarus ortmanni Williamson, 1907  – Ortmann mudbug
Cambarus parrishi Hobbs, 1981  – Hiwassee headwater crayfish
Cambarus parvoculus Hobbs & Shoup, 1947  – mountain midget crayfish
Cambarus pauleyi  Loughman, Thoma, Fetzner and Stocker, 2015 
Cambarus pecki (Hobbs, 1967)   - phantom cave crayfish
Cambarus polypilosus  Loughman & Williams, 2018 
Cambarus pristinus Hobbs, 1965  – pristine crayfish
Cambarus pyronotus R. W. Bouchard, 1978  – fireback crayfish
Cambarus reburrus Prins, 1968  – French Broad crayfish
Cambarus reduncus Hobbs, 1956 
Cambarus reflexus Hobbs, 1981 
Cambarus robustus Girard, 1852  – big water crayfish
Cambarus rusticiformis Rhoades, 1944  – Depression crayfish
Cambarus sciotensis Rhoades, 1944  – Teays River crayfish
Cambarus scotti Hobbs, 1981  – Chattooga crayfish
Cambarus setosus Faxon, 1889  – bristly cave crayfish
Cambarus smilax Loughman, Simon, and Welch, 2011  – Greenbrier crayfish
Cambarus speciosus Hobbs, 1981 
Cambarus speleocoopi Buhay & Crandall, 2009   - Sweet Home Alabama Crayfish
Cambarus sphenoides Hobbs, 1968 
Cambarus spicatus Hobbs, 1956   - Broad River spiny crayfish
Cambarus stockeri Thoma, 2011 
Cambarus striatus Hay, 1902  – Hay Crayfish
Cambarus strigosus Hobbs, 1981  – lean crayfish
Cambarus subterraneus Hobbs III, 1993  – Delaware County cave crayfish
Cambarus tartarus Hobbs & M. R. Cooper, 1972  – Oklahoma cave crayfish
Cambarus taylori Loughman, Henkanaththegedara, Fetzner and Thoma, 2017 
Cambarus tenebrosus Hay, 1902  – cavespring crayfish
Cambarus theepiensis Loughman, Foltz, Garrison and Welsh, 2013 
Cambarus truncatus Hobbs, 1981  – Oconee burrowing crayfish
Cambarus tuckasegee Cooper & Schofield, 2002 
Cambarus unestami Hobbs & Hall, 1969  – Blackbarred crayfish
Cambarus veitchorum J. E. Cooper & M. R. Cooper, 1997  – White Spring cave crayfish
Cambarus veteranus Faxon, 1914  – Guyandotte River crayfish
Cambarus williami R. W. Bouchard & J. W. Bouchard, 1995  – Brawleys Fork crayfish
Cambarus zophonastes Hobbs & Bedinger, 1964  – Hell Creek cave crayfish

References

Further reading
 

Cambaridae
Freshwater crustaceans of North America
Decapod genera
Taxa named by Wilhelm Ferdinand Erichson